John A. Morrill (June 3, 1855August 24, 1945), of Auburn, Maine, USA, was a justice of the Maine Supreme Judicial Court from March 5, 1918, to June 4, 1926.

Born in Auburn, Morrill graduated from Bowdoin College in 1876 and read law to be admitted to the bar in 1880. He served on the commission to revise statutes in 1903 and 1916, and was a probate judge from 1913 until he was appointed as an associate justice on February 25, 1918,, to a seat vacated by the death of George F. Haley. He resigned from the Court on May 31, 1926, entering active retired justice status on June 4, 1926. Following his retirement, he was an overseer of his alma mater, Bowdoin College.

Morrill died in Auburn at the age of 90.

References

1855 births
1945 deaths
People from Auburn, Maine
Bowdoin College alumni
U.S. state supreme court judges admitted to the practice of law by reading law
Justices of the Maine Supreme Judicial Court
Bowdoin College faculty